The SIAI S.16 was an Italian passenger flying boat, later serving as a military reconnaissance-bomber, claimed to be the most successful flying-boat of the 1920s.

Design and development
The first flying boat designed by the Societa Idrovolanti Alta Italia (SIAI) for use as a civilian passenger carrier, the S.13, was a biplane flying boat with room for five passengers. The S.16 was powered by a single Fiat A.12bis engine. Military versions were also developed with a bow cockpit for an observer-gunner and bomb racks fitted underneath the wings. The military version was sold to Brazil, the Soviet Union, Spain, and Turkey.

Operations

In 1925, the Italian aviator Francesco de Pinedo (1890-1933), a tenente colonnello (lieutenant colonel) in the Regia Aeronautica (Italian Royal Air Force) used an SIAI S.16ter he named Genariello for a record-setting flight from Rome to Australia and Tokyo in order to demonstrate his idea that seaplanes were superior to landplanes for long-distance flights. On 21 April, Pinedo and his mechanic, Ernesto Campanelli, departed Rome aboard Gennariello. They stopped first at Brindisi in Italy, then at Leros in Greece; Baghdad in Iraq; Bushehr and Chabar in Persia; Karachi, Bombay, Cocanada, and Calcutta in British India; Akyab, Rangoon, Tavoy, and Mergui in Burma; Phuket in Siam; Penang in British Malaya; Singapore; Batavia, Surabaya, Sumbawa, and Kupang in the Netherlands East Indies, and Broome, Carnarvon, Perth, Bunbury, Albany, Israelite Bay, and Adelaide in Australia before reaching Melbourne, where they arrived on 10 June and spent 36 days. On 16 July, Pinedo and Campanelli flew on to Sydney, where they spent another three weeks. Resuming their flight on 6 August, they visited Brisbane, Rockhampton, Townsville, Innisfail, Cooktown, and Thursday Island in Australia; Merauke, Dobo, Amboina, and Menado in the Netherlands East Indies; Cebu, Atimonan, Manila, and Aparri in the Philippines; Tamsui on Formosa; Shanghai in China; Mokpo in Korea; and Yamakawa and Kagoshima in Japan, before arriving in Tokyo on 26 September.

After a three-week stay in Tokyo, Pinedo and Campanelli began their return journey to Rome on 17 October, a 15,000-mile (24,000-km) trip that they made in only 22 days – an impressive speed at the time – with stops at Kagoshima in Japan; Shanghai in China; Hong Kong; Haiphong and Saigon in French Indochina; Bangkok in Siam; Rangoon in Burma; Calcutta, Benares, Delhi, and Karachi in British India; Bandar Abbas in Persia; Baghdad in Iraq; Alexandretta in Turkey; and Taranto in Italy before arriving in Rome on 7 November. Pinedo and Campanelli had carried a jib sail and boat rudder to allow them to sail their flying boat through unfamiliar harbors in awkward winds, but they never used either the sail or the rudder during their expedition. The Fédération Aéronautique Internationale gave Pinedo its highest award, the FAI Gold Air Medal, for the flight, the first time it had awarded the medal. The Regia Aeronautica promoted Pinedo to colonnello (colonel) upon his return from the flight, and Italy's King Victor Emmanuel III made him a marchese (marquis).

Variants
S.16
Production passenger carrier powered by a Fiat A.12bis engine.
S.16bis
Improved civilian variant with reinforced hull, increased fuel capacity and a larger propeller.
S.16bis M
Military version of the S.16bis with bow cockpit, Soviet-operated versions (80 aircraft) were designated by them the S-16bis, some were licence-built in Spain.
S.16ter
Improved military variant first used by the Italian Navy from 1924, powered by a Lorraine-Dietrich 12Db vee piston engine.
S.23
Simplified variant for training, one built.

Operators

 
Brazilian Navy (15)

Spanish Navy (26 including 10 built locally)

Regia Marina (~103)

Latvian Navy (6)
 
Turkish Air Force (12)
 
Soviet Navy (80)

Specifications (S.16ter)

See also

References

Notes

Bibliography

 

 

S.16
1910s Italian civil utility aircraft
Flying boats
Single-engined pusher aircraft
Biplanes
Aircraft first flown in 1919